Fernando Quevedo Salazar (born 17 December 1964) is a former Spanish racing cyclist. He finished in last place in the 1992 Tour de France.

References

External links

1964 births
Living people
Spanish male cyclists
Cyclists from Madrid